The list of ship launches in 1685 includes a chronological list of some ships launched in 1685.


References

1685
Ship launches